The Annapolis Valley Apple Blossom Festival is an annual agricultural and heritage celebration held in Nova Scotia's Annapolis Valley usually the last weekend of May.
The festival draws tourists to the area to take in a number of festival events, local culture, local valley and its orchards in full bloom. As of 2017/2018, the festival was celebrating its 85th year - "Rooted in Tradition".

History
Established in 1933 to promote the traditions and agricultural heritage of Annapolis Valley, communities from Windsor to Digby come together to celebrate this event each year. The very first apple blossom parade was hosted in the town of Kentville in 1933.

Early promoters of the festival intended for the event to recognize the natural environment of the Valley and the historic background of the apple growing industry, as well as to provide an opportunity to foster and develop local cultural talent through participation in festival events. As a result of change and diversification of the region's growing economy, the festival now showcases a variety of local businesses while continuing to promote local cultural talent and highlight the area's natural environment.

Community involvement in the festival has always been its strength. Preparation involves 300 volunteers who plan and participate over a time frame of several months.

Events
Events such as the Grand Street Parade, Children's Parade, Coronation for Annapolisa, and the Apple Blossom Concert are complemented by other social events, such as dances, barbecues, and old-style home-cooked dinners at church and community halls, and other social affairs in towns and villages throughout the length of the valley.

The Apple Blossom Grand Street Parade is one of the largest parades in Canada, drawing close to 100,000 people along the route, which runs from New Minas to Kentville and includes marching bands and various floats sponsored by community groups, local businesses and organizations. There are also floats for candidates in the annual Leadership Competition. The candidate selected as Annapolisa represents the area for the coming year at several events. Annapolisa is traditionally crowned on Friday evening, at Acadia University U Hall. In addition to the Grand Street Parade, the Apple Blossom Festival has the largest Children's Parade in Canada, taking place on Saturday morning before the Grand Street Parade.

In the early 1990s, at Michelin's request, the Thursday night fireworks show which had always kicked off the weekend long Apple Blossom Festival, was moved to Saturday night.  Since then it has alternated between Friday and Saturday night. In recent years the fireworks have been held exclusively on Friday night as weather permits, immediately following the anniversary celebrations of a local radio station.

References

External links
 Apple Blossom Festival Website
 Our Annapolis Valley
 CBC - Apple Blossom Early Years
 Memory Nova Scotia - the Fonds

Festivals in Nova Scotia
Recurring events established in 1933
Tourist attractions in Kings County, Nova Scotia
Tourist attractions in Annapolis County, Nova Scotia
Tourist attractions in Digby County, Nova Scotia
Apple festivals
Flower festivals in the United States
Festivals established in 1933